Ustick Township is located in Whiteside County, Illinois. As of the 2010 census, its population was 613 and it contained 250 housing units.

Geography

Demographics

Notable person
Alfred N. Abbott (1862-1929), farmer and Illinois state representative, was born on a farm in Ustick Township.

References

Townships in Whiteside County, Illinois
Townships in Illinois